The  is a freight-only railway line owned and operated by the Kinuura Rinkai Railway in Aichi Prefecture, Japan, since 1977. The line extends  from Higashiura Station (on the JR Central Taketoyo Line) Higashiura, Aichi to the terminal at Hekinanshi in Hekinan, Aichi.

Operations
Freight services over the Kinuura Rinkai Railway tracks are hauled by Class KE65 diesel locomotives.

History

See also
 Kinuura Rinkai Railway Handa Line, the other line operated by the Kinuura Rinkai Railway
 List of railway lines in Japan

References

Rail transport in Aichi Prefecture
Railway lines opened in 1977
1977 establishments in Japan
1067 mm gauge railways in Japan